Eugenio Ghiozzi (born 1 March 1955), best known by his stage name Gene Gnocchi, is an Italian television presenter, comedian and former footballer.

Gnocchi was born in Fidenza into a working-class family. He was an aspiring vocalist in a rock band when he was younger, and also has a degree as a lawyer; however, both these different roads produced quite unsuccessful results.

He took advice from the general public and took the road of a comedian. He started to appear on the then unknown stage of Milan's Zelig in the 1980s, as well as an emerging comedian on the Maurizio Costanzo Show.

Gnocchi started enjoying success in the 1990s and now is mostly known for his role in Quelli che il calcio, a Raidue football-related TV show with Simona Ventura, usually aired on Sundays.

The Serie A dream
During the 2006–07 edition of Quelli che il calcio, Gnocchi challenged the entire world of football, asking for an opportunity to play five minutes in a Serie A match. He wanted to prove that he's better than some of the overrated Serie A players, and wanted to remind everyone that at the end of the day football is only a game.

A lot encouraged this initiative, including Marcello Lippi and Alessandro Del Piero. Four teams, Atalanta, Bologna (of Serie B), Siena and Torino in fact offered a trial to the comedian.

On 23 March 2007, at 52 years of age, he finally signed a three-month contract with Parma, his favourite Serie A team, for a yearly wage of €18,000, the minimum salary allowed in Italy for a professional footballer. He chose to wear the #52 shirt, referring to his age, with the name "Gnoccao", a spoof on Brazilian footballers based on his name. He was initially expected to make his debut on the day of the last league match, 27 May 2007, against Empoli. However, as Parma was still involved in the relegation battle, Gnocchi's Serie A debut did not happen. He made his debut with the Parma jersey on 31 May in a friendly match against Carpenedolo.

In February 2009, he signed a six-months deal with Genoa CFC.

References

External links
 Parma chairman on Gnocchi's signing 
 Internet Movie Database Entry
 TgCom Article 

1955 births
Living people
People from Fidenza
Italian male actors
Italian comedians
U.S. Fiorenzuola 1922 S.S. players
Parma Calcio 1913 players
Genoa C.F.C. players
Italian television personalities
Association footballers not categorized by position
Italian footballers